Kingscote is a Gothic Revival mansion and house museum at Bowery Street and Bellevue Avenue in Newport, Rhode Island, designed by Richard Upjohn and built in 1839. It was one of the first summer "cottages" constructed in Newport, and is now a National Historic Landmark.  It was remodeled and extended by George Champlin Mason and later by Stanford White.  It was owned by the King family from 1864 until 1972, when it was given to the Preservation Society of Newport County.

History

George Noble Jones owned the El Destino and Chemonie cotton plantations in Florida. He constructed this house along a farm path known as Bellevue Avenue. It was designed by Richard Upjohn and is an early example of the Gothic Revival style, with an irregular and busy roofline, with many gables and chimneys, and elaborate Gothic detailing. It is built of wood, although it was originally painted beige with sand mixed into the paint, giving it a textured appearance of sandstone.

The Jones family permanently left Newport at the outbreak of the American Civil War, and the house was sold to William Henry King in 1864, an Old China Trade merchant. King's nephew David leased the house in 1876 and embarked on a series of alterations.  He hired Newport architect George Champlin Mason to build a larger dining room and to build a new service wing, and he had the interior redecorated by the New York firm of Leon Marcotte.  He also introduced gas lighting to the premises.

In December 1880, David King hired Stanford White of McKim, Mead and White to design a new addition to the house, including new master bedrooms, a nursery, and a new dining room with opalescent glass bricks purchased from Louis Comfort Tiffany.  These alterations greatly enlarged upon Upjohn's original design yet retained the fundamental Gothic Revival character of the building.

The King family owned the house until 1972, when the last descendant bequeathed it to the Preservation Society.  The bequest included all of the furnishings as of about 1880.  Today, Kingscote is a National Historic Landmark (NHL) and a contributing property to the Bellevue Avenue Historic District, also an NHL.

Gallery

See also

List of National Historic Landmarks in Rhode Island
National Register of Historic Places listings in Newport County, Rhode Island

References

External links

Historic house museums in Rhode Island
Museums in Newport, Rhode Island
Houses in Newport, Rhode Island
Houses on the National Register of Historic Places in Rhode Island
National Historic Landmarks in Rhode Island
Houses completed in 1839
Historic American Buildings Survey in Rhode Island
Richard Upjohn buildings
McKim, Mead & White buildings
Gothic Revival architecture in Rhode Island
National Register of Historic Places in Newport, Rhode Island
Individually listed contributing properties to historic districts on the National Register in Rhode Island
Gilded Age mansions